Uniform Symbology (also known as UMTF), in the context of European financial markets, refers to a common scheme to refer to securities ("symbols"), adopted by European markets in 2008. The original announcement reads as follows:

In order to facilitate orderly and efficient trading of securities across multiple markets, the founders of the Committee on Uniform Symbology (BATS Europe, Chi-X Europe and
NASDAQ OMX Europe) agreed to create and adopt a common securities symbology to uniformly identify securities traded across Europe. A committee was formed for the purpose of
which was to create, maintain and modify as necessary the uniform methodology for securities symbology (Uniform Symbology) to be applied to the securities and to develop and use the Uniform Symbology in furtherance of the committee’s aims and objectives. Since the founding of the Committee on Uniform Symbology other members have joined including: Turquoise, NYSE Euronext and QUOTE MTF.

(See links to some of the market's press releases in the External links section below.)

Symbology Algorithm 

The Uniform Symbology Algorithm is designed to be human readable, fit into 6 characters, have no symbol clashes and where possible, be derivable from another, freely available code.

It will consist of a stock code followed by a single, lower case letter designating the primary listing exchange.

The stock code will be derived from the “local code” published by the primary exchange. These will be truncated where necessary.

If the local code contains a single letter class designator of A through Z (e.g. “STE A”) then the single letter class designator shall be retained and the code will be truncated to a maximum of 4 characters, plus the single letter class (A through Z) designator. For some Nordic stocks the share designator will be prefixed with “SDB” (e.g. “SDBA”). In this case the “SDB” should be removed and the single letter class (A through Z) designator will be retained.

Any codes containing spaces, periods, underscores or second words (other than the single letter class (A through Z) described above) will be truncated at the space, period, etc.

All remaining non-alphanumeric characters should be removed.

Stock Code Truncation Examples

Market codes by market centre (including examples) 
Note that in some cases a market code suffix is shared by multiple listing markets. For example, the letter "y" is used for stocks listed on the Athens, Cyprus and Malta exchanges.

References

Turquoise Technical specifications, version 1.1 (May 2009)

External links
 Chi-X announcement
 BATS Europe newsletter (with announcement as Item#4)
 NASDAQ OMX Europe announcement (with announcement as Item#2)
 Turquoise announcement
 QuoteMTF announcement
 NYSE Arca announcement
 Chi-X Europe Uniform Symbology

Equity securities
Stock exchanges in Europe
Security identifier types
Financial metadata